Mike Jemison (born June 3, 1983 in Greencastle, Pennsylvania) is an American football player who last played running back for the Pittsburgh Steelers of the National Football League and running back for the Hamburg Sea Devils of NFL Europe .

College career
Mike Jemison began his college career at the University of Pittsburgh, where he played in nine games as a reserve halfback and fullback in 2001. Jemison gained 78 yards on 26 carries and caught 4 passes for 39 yards that year and he then shifted to outside linebacker for the Panthers in 2002, recording 14 tackles in 12 games. Soon after that Jemison transferred to Indiana University of Pennsylvania, where he started nine games for the Crimson Hawks in 2003 where he totaled 1,311 yards and 12 touchdowns on 220 carries, the sixth-best season total in school history. Jemison started the first four games of the 2004 season, gaining 456 yards with a pair of touchdowns on 103 rushing attempts. He totaled 1,845 yards on 359 carries (5.1-yard average) with 14 touchdowns during his college career.

Professional career
On May 6, 2005 Mike Jemison was picked up by the New York Giants and played on the practice squad until his release September 13, 2005. Jemison was then picked up by the Pittsburgh Steelers on February 18, 2006. During the 2006 offseason Jemison was drafted by the NFL Europe team the Hamburg Sea Devils in the 10th round. As of Saturday April 22, 2006 Jemison ranks second in NFL Europe with 336 rushing yards and leads all running backs with 18 receptions. He has been given the nickname "Little Bus" by some as a reference to retired Steelers running back Jerome Bettis. He was picked up, again, by the NY Giants (August 2006). He was released on September 2, 2006.

He was arrested in relation to a home invasion robbery in 2007.

References

1983 births
American football running backs
Players of American football from Philadelphia
IUP Crimson Hawks football players
Living people
Pittsburgh Panthers football players
Pittsburgh Steelers players
Hamburg Sea Devils players